The 2018 Copa Verde was the 5th edition of a football competition held in Brazil. Featuring 18 clubs, Distrito Federal, Mato Grosso do Sul and Tocantins has two vacancies; Acre, Amapá, Amazonas, Espírito Santo, Mato Grosso, Pará, Rondônia and Roraima with one each. The others four berths was set according to CBF ranking.

In the finals, Paysandu defeated Atlético Itapemirim 3–1 on aggregate to win their second title and a place in the Round of 16 of the 2019 Copa do Brasil.

Qualified teams

Schedule
The schedule of the competition is as follows.

Preliminary round

|}

Bracket

Finals

Paysandu won 3–1 on aggregate.

References

Copa Verde
Copa Verde
Copa Verde